is a professional Go player.

Biography 
Murakawa was still just a 6th grader when he became a professional Go player at the Kansai Ki-in. He was only one month older than Iyama Yuta, making him the second youngest professional in Japan. This also made him the youngest Kansai Ki-in professional, edging out Yuki Satoshi by a small margin. Murakawa is the youngest ever tsumego (life and death) problem creator and number created. His rival is Iyama Yuta from the Nihon Ki-in whom he defeated in 2014 to become the Oza title holder. Murakawa is currently 8 dan. He has also won the Nagai award.

Titles and runners-up

External links
GoBase Profile
Sensei's Library
Kansai Ki-in Profile (Japanese)

1990 births
Japanese Go players
Living people